JV Games was an American video game developer based in Paradise, Nevada. They have developed a number of titles including James Bond 007: Nightfire for Game Boy Advance, as well as Pong Toss! Frat Party Games and Incoming! for WiiWare.

External links

Video game companies of the United States
Video game development companies
Companies based in Paradise, Nevada